The following is a list of rivers and creeks in Iowa.  The rivers are listed by multiple arrangements:
those that form part of the boundaries of the U.S. state of Iowa;
ordered by drainage basin, with tributaries indented under each larger river's name;
ordered alphabetically.

Rivers on the boundary

Mississippi River (Illinois, Wisconsin)
Missouri River (Nebraska)
Big Sioux River (South Dakota)
Des Moines River ( of the boundary with Missouri)

Ordered by drainage basin
This list is arranged by drainage basin, with respective tributaries indented under each larger stream's name.  All Iowa rivers are part of the Mississippi River Watershed, which in Iowa consists of the Upper Mississippi River Drainage Basin and the Missouri River Drainage Basin.

Upper Mississippi River drainage basin

Mississippi River
Fabius River (MO)
North Fabius River
Wyaconda River
Fox River
Little Fox River
Des Moines River
Competine Creek
White Breast Creek
South River
Middle River
North River
Raccoon River
North Raccoon River
South Raccoon River
Middle Raccoon River
Beaver Creek
Pea's Creek
Davis Creek
Boone River
White Fox Creek
Lizard Creek
East Fork Des Moines River
Skunk River
Cedar Creek
North Skunk River
South Skunk River
Thunder Creek
Ioway Creek
Flint River
Iowa River
Cedar River
Wolf Creek
Black Hawk Creek
Beaver Creek
West Fork Cedar River
Shell Rock River
Winnebago River
Lime Creek
Little Cedar River
English River
North English River
Middle English River
Deep River
South English River
South Fork Iowa River
East Branch Iowa River
West Branch Iowa River
Duck Creek
Wapsipinicon River
Buffalo Creek
Little Wapsipinicon River (south)
Little Wapsipinicon River (north)
Elk River
Maquoketa River
North Fork Maquoketa River
Tete Des Morts Creek
Catfish Creek
Bee Branch Creek
Little Maquoketa River
Cloie Branch
Turkey River
Little Turkey River (Clayton County, Iowa)
Volga River
Little Turkey River (Fayette County, Iowa)
Yellow River
Bear Creek
Norfolk Creek
Upper Iowa River
French Creek
Bear Creek
Waterloo Creek
Canoe Creek
Pine Creek (Canoe Creek)
Trout River
Pine Creek (Upper Iowa River tributary)  
Minnesota River (MN)
Blue Earth River

Missouri River drainage basin

Missouri River
Chariton River
South Fork Chariton River
Grand River
Thompson River
Weldon River
Little River
Platte River
Nodaway River
East Nodaway River
East Fork East Nodaway River
West Nodaway River
Middle Nodaway River
West Fork Middle Nodaway River
Rutt Branch
Tarkio River
Nishnabotna River
East Nishnabotna River
West Nishnabotna River
Walnut Creek
Silver Creek
East Branch West Nishnabotna River
West Fork West Nishnabotna River
Keg Creek
Mosquito Creek
Boyer River
Willow River
East Boyer River
Soldier River
East Soldier River
Middle Soldier River
Little Sioux River
Maple River
Ocheyedan River
Little Ocheyedan River
West Fork Little Sioux River
Floyd River
West Branch Floyd River
Little Floyd River
Perry Creek
Big Sioux River
Broken Kettle Creek
Rock River
Little Rock River

Ordered alphabetically

Bear Creek (Upper Iowa River tributary)
Bear Creek (Yellow River tributary)
Beaver Creek (Cedar River tributary)
Beaver Creek (Polk County, Iowa), a tributary of the Des Moines River
Bee Branch Creek
Big Sioux River
Black Hawk Creek
Blue Earth River
Boone River
Boyer River
Broken Kettle Creek
Buck Creek (Mississippi River tributary)
Buffalo Creek (Wapsipinicon River tributary)
Canoe Creek
Catfish Creek
Cedar River
Chariton River
Cloie Branch
Competine Creek
Davis Creek
Deep River
Des Moines River
Elk River
English River
Flint River
Floyd River
Fox River
French Creek
Grand River
Iowa River
Ioway Creek
Lime Creek
Little Cedar River
Little Fox River
Little Maquoketa River
Little Ocheyedan River
Little River
Little Rock River
Little Sioux River
Little Turkey River (Clayton County, Iowa)
Little Turkey River (Fayette County, Iowa)
Little Wapsipinicon River (north)
Little Wapsipinicon River (south)
Maple River

Maquoketa River
Middle River
Mississippi River
Missouri River
Mosquito Creek
Nishnabotna River
Nodaway River
Norfolk Creek
North Fabius River
North River
Ocheyedan River
Pea's Creek
Perry Creek
Pine Creek (Canoe Creek)
Pine Creek (Upper Missouri River tributary)
Platte River
Raccoon River
Rock Creek (Missouri River tributary)
Rock Creek (Wapsipinicon River tributary)
Rock River
Rutt Branch
Shell Rock River
Skunk River
Soldier River
South River
Tarkio River
Tete Des Morts Creek
Thompson River
Thunder Creek
Trout River
Turkey River
Upper Iowa River
Volga River
Wapsipinicon River
Waterloo Creek
Weldon River
West Fork of the Little Sioux River
White Breast Creek
White Fox Creek
Winnebago River
Wyaconda River
Yellow River

See also
List of rivers in the United States
State Line Slough (Iowa)

References

USGS Geographic Names Information Service
USGS Hydrologic Unit Map - State of Iowa (1974)

 
Iowa
Rivers